Patrick Lindesay Archibald Godfrey (born 13 February 1933) is an English actor of film, television and stage.

Life and career
Godfrey was born in Finsbury, London to Rev. Frederick Godfrey and Lois Mary Gladys (née Turner).

In 1956 Godfrey joined the Radio Drama Company by winning the Carlton Hobbs Bursary. He made his film debut in Miss Julie (1972), and appeared in several British films of the 1980s, 1990s and 2000s, including A Room with a View, The Remains of the Day, The Importance of Being Earnest, The Count of Monte Cristo, Dimensions and Les Misérables. He also played Leonardo da Vinci in the Cinderella adaptation Ever After alongside Drew Barrymore and Dougray Scott. He had many roles on television, appearing in Doctor Who, Inspector Morse, and other series.

Personal life
He has been married to actress Amanda Walker since 20 April 1960 and they have two children. Their daughter Kate Godfrey is Head of Voice for the Royal Shakespeare Company.

Filmography

Film

Television

Videogames

References

External links
 

 Patrick Godfrey BFI
 

1933 births
English male film actors
English male stage actors
People from the London Borough of Islington
English male television actors
Living people